Ken Turner (fl. 1966) is a British television and film director and screenwriter who has worked extensively on series created by Gerry Anderson.

As well as directing various episodes of Captain Scarlet and the Mysterons (1967–68), Joe 90 (1968–69) and UFO (1970–71), he also served as assistant director on the film Thunderbirds Are Go (1966).

He also collaborated with David Mitton, director on Thomas and Friends, to establish their own company, Clearwater Films, from which they started to make TV advertisements using stop-motion animation. After Turner left the company, Mitton teamed up with director Robert D. Cardona to change the name to Clearwater Features, the production company behind the first two seasons of Thomas and Friends and its spin-off series, TUGS.

References

External links

British film directors
British male screenwriters
British television directors
British television writers
British male television writers
Living people
Writers from London
Year of birth missing (living people)